Uniomerus tetralasmus is a species of freshwater mussel, an aquatic bivalve mollusk in the family Unionidae, the river mussels.

References

tetralasmus
Bivalves described in 1831